Rojan Hazim (born 1956), is a contemporary Kurdish writer, journalist, translator and literary critic. He was born in Hakkari, southeastern Turkey and founded Xanî & Bateyî publishers in 1989. His articles have appeared in many magazines and newspapers including Nûdem, Huner, Özgür Politika, Ek Politika, Yeni Gündem and Hîwa. He served as the Editor of the Roja Gel, Bingeh and Hêza Welatparêz from 1980 to 1991. He is also literary critic at KURMANCÎ journal published by the Kurdish Institute of Paris. He has translated stories and tales by Hans Christian Andersen and Pushkin into Kurdish.

Books
Masîvanê Kal û Masiyê Sor, Translation of The Tale of the Fisherman and the Fish by Pushkin, 31 pp., Xanî & Bateyî Publishers, 1984 .
Bilbil, Translation of The Nightingale by Hans Christian Andersen, 47 pp., Hans Reitzels Publishers, København, 1989. 
Editing of Zimanê çiya, Translation of Mountain Language by Harold Pinter, Xanî & Bateyî Publishers, Brøndby, 1990.
Helbestvan û nivîskarekî welatparêz Evdirehîm Rehmîyê Hekarî (Abdurrahim Zapsu) (Abdurrahim Hakkri, the Patriotic Poet and Writer), 130 pp., Xanî & Bateyî Publishers, København, 1991.
Stran: Stranen Kurd & Danmark = Sang: Kurdisk & Dansk Sangbog, (Kurdish and Danish Songs), 115 pp., Xanî & Bateyî Publishers, København, 1994.
6 Name,93 pp., Xanî & Bateyî Publishers, København, 1994.

Pelatînk, Translation of The Butterfly by Hans Christian Andersen, 85 pp., Xanî & Bateyî Publishers, København, 1995.
Bîranîna Elî Kaşifpûr, 198 pp., Xanî & Bateyî Publishers, Brøndby, 1997. 
Zimanê Wêneya, Kurdish-Danish Illustrated Dictionary, 75 pp., Xanî & Bateyî Publishers, København, 2000.
Kürdistan'a Sevgiler (in Turkish), 153 pp., Kurdish Institute of Brussels, 2001. 
Bîr û Raman, 123 pp., Kurdish Institute of Brussels, 2001. 
Københavnskriterierne & Krîterên Kopenhagê, 68 pp., Koerden: Speciaalnummer, Kurdish Institute of Brussels, 2002. 
Paşeroj, 193 pp., Kurdish Institute of Brussels, 2003.
Zimanê Kurdi devokê Hekariya (gramer & ferheng) (Hakkari dialect of the Kurdish language: Grammar and Dictionary), 2004.

Links with list of works
Bilbil (Nattergalen), The Hans Christian Andersen Center, Denmark.
Rojan Hazim, BazArt.dk
Digital Library, Kurdish Institute of Paris.

References

1956 births
Living people
Kurdish-language writers